The 1952 Pittsburgh Pirates season was the team's 71st season in Major League Baseball, and their 66th season in the National League. The Pirates posted a record of 42 wins and 112 losses, their worst record since 1890, and one of the worst in major league history.

Offseason 
The Pirates were led in 1952 by 70-year-old general manager Branch Rickey and 60-year-old manager Billy Meyer. Meyer had led Pittsburgh to a last-place finish in the National League in 1950. After Rickey was installed as general manager, the Pirates were second-to-last in 1951. Tension was high as the two-year contract of their star slugger, Ralph Kiner, expired before the 1952 season. Kiner was the premier power hitter in baseball, having won the previous six National League home run titles. Rickey voiced what he viewed as inconsistent levels of commitment by Kiner when talking to the media. Kiner received permission to instead negotiate directly with owner John W. Galbreath and agreed to a reported one-year, $90,000 contract, making him the highest-paid player in the National League. Kiner was signed, but the most famous Pirate of all, 78-year-old Hall of Fame member Honus Wagner, decided to retire from his part-time coaching duties with the team. His number was retired, and he was given a lifetime pass to Forbes Field.

Rickey wanted to hold a tryout for dozens of kids from the low minor league levels, and his plan was largely supported by Bing Crosby and the rest of the team's ownership. Rickey hired his former scout and coach Clyde Sukeforth, who had scouted Jackie Robinson for Rickey in the 1940s. Several top young prospects, like Vern Law and Danny O'Connell, were called to military service for the Korean War, and the more experienced Danny Murtaugh retired to accept a minor league managing position. Expectations were high for 23-year-old outfielder Gus Bell to support Kiner in the lineup. Murry Dickson, who had won 21 games in 1951, nearly a third of the entire team's win total, was once again expected to be the anchor of the pitching rotation.

Notable transactions 
 Prior to 1952 season: Sonny Senerchia was signed as a free agent by the Pirates.

Regular season

Season summary

A season to forget 
The Pirates struggled throughout spring training in 1952. Gus Bell missed training time due to family-related car problems and illness and was sent to the minor leagues. Towards the end of spring training, pitcher Bill Werle was suspended indefinitely and fined $500, only the third player fined in over two decades of Billy Meyer's managing career. Werle professed his innocence and was reinstated before Opening Day but he was traded to the St. Louis Cardinals two weeks later.

Thirteen rookies made the Pirates' Opening Day roster, including four teenagers: Bobby Del Greco, Tony Bartirome, Jim Waugh and Lee Walls. After four games, Pittsburgh's record was 2–2 but they quickly tumbled to the bottom of the majors by losing 16 of their next 17 games.  The early two-game winning streak matched the longest they would see all year.  Their top three pitchers combined to win just one of their first nine games started. Kiner's hitting was affected by the lack of support as well as back problems and his batting average was under .220 several weeks into the season. Kiner's difficulties and a club earned run average over five resulted in a 5–28 record in mid-May.  Gus Bell returned from the minors on May 12 and hit for some power but Kiner hit only .241 with 13 home runs and 31 RBIs in the first half which ended with Pittsburgh at 21–59. 21-year-old Dick Groat was one of the Pirates' few bright spots in the first half with four hits in his first three games, but others went into long slumps like Jack Merson's 0-for-35, Clyde McCullough's 0-for-24 and Tony Bartirome's 0-for-29.

The second half soon resembled the first with a 2–11 stretch in mid-July. They were mathematically eliminated from pennant contention on August 6 with more than six weeks left to play. In early August, Pittsburgh called up 20-year-old pitcher Ron Necciai from the minors.  Necciai had pitched a legendary 27-strikeout game in the minors but gave up five runs in his first inning in the majors.  Necciai not only finished the season with poor numbers but also injured his arm and never again pitched in the majors. Branch Rickey's youth movement, derided as "Operation Peach Fuzz", continued unabated. On August 20, the average age of Pittsburgh's starting lineup was only 23 with Kiner and Garagiola being the only non-rookies. On September 5, pitcher Bill Bell made his major league debut at age 18. Including Bell, seven of the eight youngest players in the National League in 1952 were Pittsburgh Pirates. The "Rickey Dinks", as they were sometimes called, were not only young but small. In one game, the entire infield was less than six feet tall.

The Pirates difficulties reached off the field as well. Ralph Kiner, enduring his worst season to-date, received a death threat in an attempt to extort $6,200. Rather than pay, he contacted the authorities and was kept under guard for a time. Financially, Pittsburgh's attendance was the lowest since World War II, falling more than 30% short of the one million budgeted. Branch Rickey sometimes saved money by sending only 21 players on road trips. The final losses for the franchise, including minor leagues and bonuses, were $800,000.

Billy Meyer resigned as manager on September 27, the second-to-last day of the season.

Final results 
When the season mercifully ended, Pittsburgh's final record was 42–112.  The winning percentage and number of losses were the worst for the franchise since the 1890 season (which was greatly affected by the inclusion of the Players' League) and the worst for any franchise since the 1935 Boston Braves. Since 1952, the only non-expansion team to finish worse has been the 2003 Detroit Tigers.

A few individuals came away with positive notes. A late-season home run surge by Ralph Kiner brought him his seventh consecutive home run championship (he finished tied with Hank Sauer with 37 on the year). It was also his last.  Dick Groat finished at .284 and was third in National League Rookie of the Year voting. Joe Garagiola logged the most playing time of his career and hit .273 with a career-high 54 RBIs, third most on the team behind only Kiner and Gus Bell.

On the flipside, teenagers Tony Bartirome and Bobby Del Greco were regulars but neither hit over .220. Seven other players had at least 40 at-bats but hit under .200.  Kiner's home run total (37) was more than the next four highest on the team combined (16, 8, 7, 5). As a team, Pittsburgh was last in the National League in runs, hits, doubles, triples, home runs, RBIs, batting average, slugging percentage, complete games, ERA, walks allowed, home runs allowed, fielding percentage and errors committed. Murry Dickson, who won 21 games in 1951, lost 20 games in 1952, going 14–20. Only three other pitchers won more than two games. The pitching staff walked 615 opposing batters while striking out only 564, with 16 different players starting a game during the season.

Among their young players, only Jim Waugh – the youngest – played in the majors again before 1955. Waugh played in 1953, his last year; Ron Necciai and Tony Bartirome never played in the majors after 1952; Bill Bell pitched one inning in 1955, his last; and Bobby Del Greco, Lee Walls and Ron Kline had longer careers but not until several years later. Dick Groat and pitcher Bob Friend were the only players to endure the 1952 season who also played with the 1960 World Series champion Pirates.

Anecdotes, etc. 
The failure of the 1952 Pirates was the source of several anecdotes and side-stories. Pittsburgh Press writer Len Biederman recalled an earlier humorous practice by giving Dick Groat a dime while he was in an 0-for-19 slump. When Groat broke out of the slump with a 5-for-5 game, Biederman gave Kiner a quarter with similar positive results so Biederman continued giving coins to various Pirates. Joe Garagiola, the regular catcher for the 1952 Pirates, frequently used the team's struggles in his later career as a baseball sportscaster with lines like, "They talk about Pearl Harbor being something; they should have seen the 1952 Pittsburgh Pirates" and "In an eight-team league, we should've finished ninth."

Season standings

Record vs. opponents

Game log

|- bgcolor="ffbbbb"
| 1 || April 15 || @ Cardinals || 2–3 || Staley || Dickson (0–1) || Brazle || 15,850 || 0–1
|- bgcolor="ffbbbb"
| 2 || April 16 || @ Cardinals || 5–6 || Chambers || Pollet (0–1) || Brazle || 4,324 || 0–2
|- bgcolor="ccffcc"
| 3 || April 17 || @ Cardinals || 5–3 || Muir (1–0) || Yuhas || Wilks (1) || 4,907 || 1–2
|- bgcolor="ccffcc"
| 4 || April 18 || Reds || 3–0 || Friend (1–0) || Blackwell || — || 29,874 || 2–2
|- bgcolor="ffbbbb"
| 5 || April 19 || Reds || 3–9 || Wehmeier || Queen (0–1) || — || 10,271 || 2–3
|- bgcolor="ffbbbb"
| 6 || April 20 || Reds || 6–8 || Perkowski || Dickson (0–2) || Byerly ||  || 2–4
|- bgcolor="ffbbbb"
| 7 || April 20 || Reds || 2–12 || Hiller || Pollet (0–2) || — || 23,732 || 2–5
|- bgcolor="ffbbbb"
| 8 || April 21 || Cubs || 1–7 || Minner || Kline (0–1) || — || 12,378 || 2–6
|- bgcolor="ffbbbb"
| 9 || April 22 || Cubs || 2–13 || Rush || Friend (1–1) || — || 9,321 || 2–7
|- bgcolor="ffbbbb"
| 10 || April 25 || Cardinals || 4–6 || Staley || Muir (1–1) || Brazle || 1,945 || 2–8
|- bgcolor="ffbbbb"
| 11 || April 26 || @ Reds || 2–9 || Wehmeier || Dickson (0–3) || Smith || 4,239 || 2–9
|- bgcolor="ffbbbb"
| 12 || April 27 || @ Reds || 2–8 || Raffensberger || Friend (1–2) || — ||  || 2–10
|- bgcolor="ffbbbb"
| 13 || April 27 || @ Reds || 0–1 || Hiller || Pollet (0–3) || — || 16,427 || 2–11
|- bgcolor="ffbbbb"
| 14 || April 29 || Braves || 1–5 || Spahn || Friend (1–3) || — || 10,008 || 2–12
|- bgcolor="ccffcc"
| 15 || April 30 || Braves || 11–5 || Dickson (1–3) || Cole || Wilks (2) || 2,861 || 3–12
|-

|- bgcolor="ffbbbb"
| 16 || May 1 || Giants || 5–13 || Hearn || Queen (0–2) || — || 4,801 || 3–13
|- bgcolor="ffbbbb"
| 17 || May 2 || Giants || 3–5 (10) || Wilhelm || Wilks (0–1) || Spencer || 17,111 || 3–14
|- bgcolor="ffbbbb"
| 18 || May 3 || Giants || 2–3 || Maglie || Kline (0–2) || — || 7,451 || 3–15
|- bgcolor="ffbbbb"
| 19 || May 4 || Dodgers || 0–6 || Erskine || Dickson (1–4) || — || 19,322 || 3–16
|- bgcolor="ffbbbb"
| 20 || May 5 || Dodgers || 1–5 (8) || Branca || Friend (1–4) || — || 3,652 || 3–17
|- bgcolor="ffbbbb"
| 21 || May 6 || Phillies || 0–6 || Roberts || Carlsen (0–1) || — || 9,008 || 3–18
|- bgcolor="ccffcc"
| 22 || May 7 || Phillies || 5–1 || Pollet (1–3) || Meyer || — || 7,291 || 4–18
|- bgcolor="ffbbbb"
| 23 || May 10 || @ Cubs || 1–3 || Rush || Dickson (1–5) || — || 7,438 || 4–19
|- bgcolor="ffbbbb"
| 24 || May 11 || @ Cubs || 2–8 || Minner || Kline (0–3) || — ||  || 4–20
|- bgcolor="ccffcc"
| 25 || May 11 || @ Cubs || 11–2 || Friend (2–4) || Klippstein || — || 14,845 || 5–20
|- bgcolor="ffbbbb"
| 26 || May 13 || @ Braves || 1–3 || Bickford || Pollet (1–4) || — || 2,831 || 5–21
|- bgcolor="ffbbbb"
| 27 || May 14 || @ Braves || 3–4 (10) || Surkont || Main (0–1) || — || 1,105 || 5–22
|- bgcolor="ffbbbb"
| 28 || May 15 || @ Dodgers || 0–2 || Loes || Dickson (1–6) || — || 14,402 || 5–23
|- bgcolor="ffbbbb"
| 29 || May 16 || @ Dodgers || 4–6 || Labine || Main (0–2) || — || 3,385 || 5–24
|- bgcolor="ffbbbb"
| 30 || May 17 || @ Dodgers || 7–12 || Wade || Kline (0–4) || — || 11,067 || 5–25
|- bgcolor="ffbbbb"
| 31 || May 19 || @ Giants || 0–4 || Maglie || Pollet (1–5) || — || 4,461 || 5–26
|- bgcolor="ffbbbb"
| 32 || May 21 || @ Phillies || 3–7 || Roberts || Dickson (1–7) || — || 6,202 || 5–27
|- bgcolor="ffbbbb"
| 33 || May 22 || @ Phillies || 0–6 || Simmons || Munger (0–1) || — || 3,065 || 5–28
|- bgcolor="ccffcc"
| 34 || May 23 || Cubs || 6–5 (13) || Wilks (1–1) || Hacker || — || 8,496 || 6–28
|- bgcolor="ffbbbb"
| 35 || May 24 || Cubs || 5–7 || Minner || Pollet (1–6) || Klippstein || 3,118 || 6–29
|- bgcolor="ffbbbb"
| 36 || May 25 || Cubs || 4–5 || Hacker || Wilks (1–2) || Leonard || 5,111 || 6–30
|- bgcolor="ccffcc"
| 37 || May 26 || Reds || 6–3 || Friend (3–4) || Hiller || — || 6,171 || 7–30
|- bgcolor="ffbbbb"
| 38 || May 27 || Reds || 4–5 (14) || Smith || Main (0–3) || — || 2,150 || 7–31
|- bgcolor="ffbbbb"
| 39 || May 28 || Reds || 2–5 || Raffensberger || Munger (0–2) || — || 6,186 || 7–32
|- bgcolor="ccffcc"
| 40 || May 29 || Reds || 4–2 || Dickson (2–7) || Perkowski || — || 1,070 || 8–32
|- bgcolor="ffbbbb"
| 41 || May 30 || Cardinals || 2–3 || Yuhas || Friend (3–5) || Brazle ||  || 8–33
|- bgcolor="ccffcc"
| 42 || May 30 || Cardinals || 4–3 || LaPalme (1–0) || Staley || — || 19,546 || 9–33
|- bgcolor="ccffcc"
| 43 || May 31 || Phillies || 5–3 || Muir (2–1) || Possehl || Main (1) || 6,425 || 10–33
|-

|- bgcolor="ffbbbb"
| 44 || June 1 || Phillies || 1–5 || Simmons || Dickson (2–8) || — ||  || 10–34
|- bgcolor="ccffcc"
| 45 || June 1 || Phillies || 2–1 || Wilks (2–2) || Drews || — || 15,529 || 11–34
|- bgcolor="ffbbbb"
| 46 || June 3 || Dodgers || 4–6 || Branca || Munger (0–3) || Rutherford || 19,452 || 11–35
|- bgcolor="ffbbbb"
| 47 || June 4 || Dodgers || 4–7 || Erskine || Friend (3–6) || Loes || 14,421 || 11–36
|- bgcolor="ffbbbb"
| 48 || June 5 || Dodgers || 0–2 || Wade || Main (0–4) || — || 6,328 || 11–37
|- bgcolor="ccffcc"
| 49 || June 6 || Giants || 8–1 || Dickson (3–8) || Maglie || — || 20,163 || 12–37
|- bgcolor="ffbbbb"
| 50 || June 7 || Giants || 5–7 || Spencer || Main (0–5) || Lanier || 7,656 || 12–38
|- bgcolor="ffbbbb"
| 51 || June 8 || Giants || 1–9 || Jansen || Pollet (1–7) || — || 13,942 || 12–39
|- bgcolor="ffbbbb"
| 52 || June 9 || Braves || 2–3 || Wilson || Friend (3–7) || — || 6,973 || 12–40
|- bgcolor="ccffcc"
| 53 || June 10 || Braves || 7–5 || Wilks (3–2) || Spahn || — || 10,934 || 13–40
|- bgcolor="ccffcc"
| 54 || June 11 || Braves || 5–0 || Dickson (4–8) || Surkont || — || 9,415 || 14–40
|- bgcolor="ffbbbb"
| 55 || June 12 || Braves || 2–11 || Burdette || Muir (2–2) || — || 3,223 || 14–41
|- bgcolor="ffbbbb"
| 56 || June 14 || @ Phillies || 2–4 || Meyer || Friend (3–8) || Konstanty || 5,033 || 14–42
|- bgcolor="ccffcc"
| 57 || June 15 || @ Phillies || 6–0 || Pollet (2–7) || Drews || — ||  || 15–42
|- bgcolor="ffbbbb"
| 58 || June 15 || @ Phillies || 3–6 || Fox || Dickson (4–9) || Konstanty || 12,525 || 15–43
|- bgcolor="ffbbbb"
| 59 || June 16 || @ Phillies || 4–5 || Konstanty || LaPalme (1–1) || — || 2,210 || 15–44
|- bgcolor="ccffcc"
| 60 || June 17 || @ Giants || 6–2 || Main (1–5) || Gregg || — || 11,317 || 16–44
|- bgcolor="ffbbbb"
| 61 || June 18 || @ Giants || 2–5 || Hearn || Friend (3–9) || — || 3,346 || 16–45
|- bgcolor="ccffcc"
| 62 || June 19 || @ Giants || 8–1 || Dickson (5–9) || Jansen || — || 6,369 || 17–45
|- bgcolor="ffbbbb"
| 63 || June 20 || @ Dodgers || 4–5 || Labine || Wilks (3–3) || — || 4,679 || 17–46
|- bgcolor="ffbbbb"
| 64 || June 21 || @ Dodgers || 4–14 || Loes || Main (1–6) || Erskine || 13,335 || 17–47
|- bgcolor="ffbbbb"
| 65 || June 23 || @ Braves || 3–9 || Johnson || Friend (3–10) || — || 2,654 || 17–48
|- bgcolor="ffbbbb"
| 66 || June 24 || @ Braves || 3–4 || Wilson || Dickson (5–10) || — || 3,736 || 17–49
|- bgcolor="ffbbbb"
| 67 || June 25 || @ Braves || 2–5 || Surkont || Pollet (2–8) || — || 1,414 || 17–50
|- bgcolor="ffbbbb"
| 68 || June 27 || Cardinals || 4–6 || Yuhas || Muir (2–3) || Brazle || 16,133 || 17–51
|- bgcolor="ffbbbb"
| 69 || June 28 || Cardinals || 3–4 || Yuhas || Dickson (5–11) || — || 5,417 || 17–52
|- bgcolor="ccffcc"
| 70 || June 29 || Cardinals || 2–1 (5) || Pollet (3–8) || Boyer || — || 14,870 || 18–52
|- bgcolor="ffbbbb"
| 71 || June 30 || @ Cubs || 4–5 || Klippstein || Friend (3–11) || — || 5,983 || 18–53
|-

|- bgcolor="ccffcc"
| 72 || July 1 || @ Cubs || 3–2 || Main (2–6) || Ramsdell || Wilks (3) || 9,935 || 19–53
|- bgcolor="ffbbbb"
| 73 || July 2 || @ Cubs || 3–8 || Minner || Dickson (5–12) || — ||  || 19–54
|- bgcolor="ffbbbb"
| 74 || July 2 || @ Cubs || 0–3 (8) || Hacker || Kline (0–5) || — || 16,543 || 19–55
|- bgcolor="ffbbbb"
| 75 || July 3 || @ Reds || 1–5 || Church || Pollet (3–9) || — || 1,807 || 19–56
|- bgcolor="ccffcc"
| 76 || July 4 || @ Reds || 4–2 || Friend (4–11) || Perkowski || — ||  || 20–56
|- bgcolor="ccffcc"
| 77 || July 4 || @ Reds || 5–2 || Fisher (1–0) || Nuxhall || Wilks (4) || 8,253 || 21–56
|- bgcolor="ffbbbb"
| 78 || July 5 || @ Cardinals || 0–5 || Brazle || Main (2–7) || — || 15,625 || 21–57
|- bgcolor="ffbbbb"
| 79 || July 6 || @ Cardinals || 5–6 || Yuhas || Dickson (5–13) || — ||  || 21–58
|- bgcolor="ffbbbb"
| 80 || July 6 || @ Cardinals || 4–6 || Brecheen || Friend (4–12) || — || 17,048 || 21–59
|- bgcolor="ccffcc"
| 81 || July 10 || Giants || 6–4 (12) || Wilks (4–3) || Spencer || — || 15,226 || 22–59
|- bgcolor="ccffcc"
| 82 || July 11 || Giants || 6–2 || Dickson (6–13) || Maglie || — || 4,482 || 23–59
|- bgcolor="ffbbbb"
| 83 || July 12 || Braves || 2–5 || Bickford || Friend (4–13) || — || 4,999 || 23–60
|- bgcolor="ffbbbb"
| 84 || July 13 || Braves || 2–4 || Surkont || Fisher (1–1) || — ||  || 23–61
|- bgcolor="ffbbbb"
| 85 || July 13 || Braves || 1–2 || Jester || Wilks (4–4) || — || 12,373 || 23–62
|- bgcolor="ffbbbb"
| 86 || July 15 || Phillies || 3–10 || Simmons || Pollet (3–10) || — || 10,244 || 23–63
|- bgcolor="ffbbbb"
| 87 || July 16 || Phillies || 7–8 || Roberts || Dickson (6–14) || Hansen || 2,569 || 23–64
|- bgcolor="ccffcc"
| 88 || July 17 || Phillies || 2–1 || Hogue (1–0) || Meyer || — ||  || 24–64
|- bgcolor="ccffcc"
| 89 || July 17 || Phillies || 4–2 || Wilks (5–4) || Drews || — || 5,304 || 25–64
|- bgcolor="ffbbbb"
| 90 || July 18 || Dodgers || 2–6 || Loes || Friend (4–14) || Black || 19,681 || 25–65
|- bgcolor="ffbbbb"
| 91 || July 19 || Dodgers || 1–9 || Erskine || Pollet (3–11) || — || 5,662 || 25–66
|- bgcolor="ffbbbb"
| 92 || July 20 || Dodgers || 5–8 || Wade || Dickson (6–15) || Black || 14,490 || 25–67
|- bgcolor="ffbbbb"
| 93 || July 22 || @ Phillies || 4–14 || Meyer || Hogue (1–1) || — ||  || 25–68
|- bgcolor="ffbbbb"
| 94 || July 22 || @ Phillies || 1–8 || Drews || Main (2–8) || Hansen || 11,213 || 25–69
|- bgcolor="ffbbbb"
| 95 || July 23 || @ Phillies || 1–4 || Ridzik || Friend (4–15) || Roberts || 4,611 || 25–70
|- bgcolor="ccffcc"
| 96 || July 25 || @ Braves || 3–2 || Dickson (7–15) || Spahn || — || 4,126 || 26–70
|- bgcolor="ccffcc"
| 97 || July 26 || @ Braves || 6–4 || Pollet (4–11) || Jester || — || 2,006 || 27–70
|- bgcolor="ffbbbb"
| 98 || July 27 || @ Braves || 2–5 || Bickford || Hogue (1–2) || Burdette ||  || 27–71
|- bgcolor="ffffff"
| 99 || July 27 || @ Braves || 3–3 (11) ||  ||  || — || 3,719 || 27–71
|- bgcolor="ccffcc"
| 100 || July 29 || @ Dodgers || 7–1 || Dickson (8–15) || Loes || — || 11,807 || 28–71
|- bgcolor="ffbbbb"
| 101 || July 30 || @ Dodgers || 3–4 (10) || Black || Friend (4–16) || — || 5,110 || 28–72
|- bgcolor="ffbbbb"
| 102 || July 31 || @ Dodgers || 6–7 (11) || Black || LaPalme (1–2) || — ||  || 28–73
|- bgcolor="ffbbbb"
| 103 || July 31 || @ Dodgers || 1–4 || Landrum || Main (2–9) || — ||  || 28–74
|-

|- bgcolor="ffbbbb"
| 104 || August 1 || @ Giants || 3–7 || Hearn || Fisher (1–2) || — || 10,458 || 28–75
|- bgcolor="ffbbbb"
| 105 || August 2 || @ Giants || 3–4 (6) || Wilhelm || Dickson (8–16) || — || 4,174 || 28–76
|- bgcolor="ccffcc"
| 106 || August 3 || @ Giants || 7–0 || Dickson (9–16) || Lanier || — ||  || 29–76
|- bgcolor="ccffcc"
| 107 || August 3 || @ Giants || 10–8 (6) || Pollet (5–11) || Jansen || Main (2) || 17,965 || 30–76
|- bgcolor="ffbbbb"
| 108 || August 5 || Cardinals || 3–4 (12) || Presko || Hogue (1–3) || — || 10,235 || 30–77
|- bgcolor="ffbbbb"
| 109 || August 6 || Cardinals || 2–7 (10) || Brazle || Wilks (5–5) || — ||  || 30–78
|- bgcolor="ffbbbb"
| 110 || August 6 || Cardinals || 2–3 || Boyer || Main (2–10) || Yuhas || 11,999 || 30–79
|- bgcolor="ccffcc"
| 111 || August 8 || Cubs || 1–0 (10) || Dickson (10–16) || Rush || — || 8,503 || 31–79
|- bgcolor="ccffcc"
| 112 || August 9 || Cubs || 4–3 || Waugh (1–0) || Kelly || — || 4,196 || 32–79
|- bgcolor="ffbbbb"
| 113 || August 10 || Cubs || 5–9 || Hacker || Necciai (0–1) || Leonard ||  || 32–80
|- bgcolor="ffbbbb"
| 114 || August 10 || Cubs || 3–4 || Minner || Pollet (5–12) || Leonard || 17,773 || 32–81
|- bgcolor="ffbbbb"
| 115 || August 11 || Reds || 4–10 || Wehmeier || Hogue (1–4) || Smith || 9,304 || 32–82
|- bgcolor="ccffcc"
| 116 || August 14 || @ Cardinals || 5–3 (10) || Dickson (11–16) || Presko || — || 9,524 || 33–82
|- bgcolor="ffbbbb"
| 117 || August 15 || @ Cardinals || 4–5 || Brazle || Main (2–11) || — || 6,115 || 33–83
|- bgcolor="ccffcc"
| 118 || August 16 || @ Cubs || 2–1 || Pollet (6–12) || Minner || — || 12,256 || 34–83
|- bgcolor="ffbbbb"
| 119 || August 17 || @ Cubs || 2–5 || Rush || Waugh (1–1) || — ||  || 34–84
|- bgcolor="ccffcc"
| 120 || August 17 || @ Cubs || 5–2 || Friend (5–16) || Kelly || — || 26,635 || 35–84
|- bgcolor="ffbbbb"
| 121 || August 18 || @ Cubs || 3–4 || Schultz || Dickson (11–17) || — || 4,911 || 35–85
|- bgcolor="ffbbbb"
| 122 || August 19 || Phillies || 5–10 || Roberts || Necciai (0–2) || — || 11,207 || 35–86
|- bgcolor="ffbbbb"
| 123 || August 20 || Phillies || 1–3 || Meyer || Hogue (1–5) || — || 2,755 || 35–87
|- bgcolor="ffbbbb"
| 124 || August 22 || Dodgers || 2–9 || Black || Pollet (6–13) || — ||  || 35–88
|- bgcolor="ccffcc"
| 125 || August 22 || Dodgers || 3–2 || Dickson (12–17) || Landrum || — || 21,845 || 36–88
|- bgcolor="ffbbbb"
| 126 || August 23 || Dodgers || 2–3 || Labine || Waugh (1–2) || Black || 8,844 || 36–89
|- bgcolor="ccffcc"
| 127 || August 24 || Braves || 4–3 || Necciai (1–2) || Jester || Dickson (1) ||  || 37–89
|- bgcolor="ffbbbb"
| 128 || August 24 || Braves || 3–5 (10) || Burdette || Kline (0–6) || — || 12,349 || 37–90
|- bgcolor="ffbbbb"
| 129 || August 26 || Giants || 7–14 || Wilhelm || Dickson (12–18) || Lanier || 14,011 || 37–91
|- bgcolor="ffbbbb"
| 130 || August 27 || Giants || 4–5 || Connelly || Pollet (6–14) || Jansen || 4,069 || 37–92
|- bgcolor="ffbbbb"
| 131 || August 28 || Giants || 7–14 || Koslo || Waugh (1–3) || — || 3,561 || 37–93
|- bgcolor="ffbbbb"
| 132 || August 30 || Cardinals || 2–12 || Staley || Necciai (1–3) || — || 10,500 || 37–94
|- bgcolor="ccffcc"
| 133 || August 31 || Cardinals || 4–2 || Dickson (13–18) || Miller || — || 7,871 || 38–94
|-

|- bgcolor="ffbbbb"
| 134 || September 1 || Cubs || 0–6 || Klippstein || Pollet (6–15) || — ||  || 38–95
|- bgcolor="ccffcc"
| 135 || September 1 || Cubs || 5–4 (11) || Dickson (14–18) || Leonard || — || 13,031 || 39–95
|- bgcolor="ffbbbb"
| 136 || September 3 || @ Reds || 0–1 || Raffensberger || Necciai (1–4) || — || 4,230 || 39–96
|- bgcolor="ffbbbb"
| 137 || September 4 || @ Reds || 2–7 || Wehmeier || Waugh (1–4) || — || 1,519 || 39–97
|- bgcolor="ffbbbb"
| 138 || September 5 || @ Cardinals || 0–4 || Mizell || Bell (0–1) || — || 4,327 || 39–98
|- bgcolor="ffbbbb"
| 139 || September 6 || @ Cardinals || 4–7 (10) || Brazle || Dickson (14–19) || — || 7,329 || 39–99
|- bgcolor="ffbbbb"
| 140 || September 7 || @ Cardinals || 3–4 || Brazle || Waugh (1–5) || — || 9,298 || 39–100
|- bgcolor="ffbbbb"
| 141 || September 9 || @ Giants || 6–11 || Connelly || Hogue (1–6) || Spencer || 2,894 || 39–101
|- bgcolor="ffbbbb"
| 142 || September 10 || @ Giants || 2–3 (13) || Wilhelm || Dickson (14–20) || — || 3,742 || 39–102
|- bgcolor="ffbbbb"
| 143 || September 11 || @ Giants || 4–5 || Maglie || Pollet (6–16) || Wilhelm || 3,094 || 39–103
|- bgcolor="ccffcc"
| 144 || September 12 || @ Braves || 8–1 || Friend (6–16) || Jester || — ||  || 40–103
|- bgcolor="ffbbbb"
| 145 || September 12 || @ Braves || 0–16 || Johnson || Necciai (1–5) || — || 2,608 || 40–104
|- bgcolor="ffbbbb"
| 146 || September 13 || @ Braves || 0–8 || Spahn || Kline (0–7) || — || 1,957 || 40–105
|- bgcolor="ffbbbb"
| 147 || September 14 || @ Phillies || 2–5 || Simmons || Hogue (1–7) || — ||  || 40–106
|- bgcolor="ffbbbb"
| 148 || September 14 || @ Phillies || 1–2 || Meyer || Waugh (1–6) || — || 7,238 || 40–107
|- bgcolor="ffbbbb"
| 149 || September 16 || @ Dodgers || 2–4 || Hughes || Dickson (14–21) || Black || 13,422 || 40–108
|- bgcolor="ccffcc"
| 150 || September 17 || @ Dodgers || 4–1 || Pollet (7–16) || Wade || Dickson (2) || 5,895 || 41–108
|- bgcolor="ffbbbb"
| 151 || September 19 || Reds || 3–4 || Wehmeier || Friend (6–17) || — || 5,435 || 41–109
|- bgcolor="ffbbbb"
| 152 || September 21 || Reds || 3–4 || Podbielan || Necciai (1–6) || — || 22,398 || 41–110
|- bgcolor="ffbbbb"
| 153 || September 26 || @ Reds || 0–5 || Podbielan || Hogue (1–8) || — || 3,893 || 41–111
|- bgcolor="ccffcc"
| 154 || September 27 || @ Reds || 9–6 || Friend (7–17) || Perkowski || — || 2,084 || 42–111
|- bgcolor="ffbbbb"
| 155 || September 28 || @ Reds || 2–3 || Raffensberger || Main (2–12) || — || 7,354 || 42–112
|-

|-
| Legend:       = Win       = Loss       = TieBold = Pirates team member

Opening Day lineup

Notable transactions 
 May 17, 1952: Bill Howerton was selected off waivers from the Pirates by the New York Giants.
 June 16, 1952: Dick Groat was signed as an amateur free agent by the Pirates.

Roster

Player stats

Batting

Starters by position 
Note: Pos = Position; G = Games played; AB = At bats; H = Hits; Avg. = Batting average; HR = Home runs; RBI = Runs batted in

Other batters 
Note: G = Games played; AB = At bats; H = Hits; Avg. = Batting average; HR = Home runs; RBI = Runs batted in

Pitching

Starting pitchers 
Note: G = Games pitched; IP = Innings pitched; W = Wins; L = Losses; ERA = Earned run average; SO = Strikeouts

Other pitchers 
Note: G = Games pitched; IP = Innings pitched; W = Wins; L = Losses; ERA = Earned run average; SO = Strikeouts

Relief pitchers 
Note: G = Games pitched; W = Wins; L = Losses; SV = Saves; ERA = Earned run average; SO = Strikeouts

Farm system

See also
List of worst Major League Baseball season records

Notes

References 

1952 Pittsburgh Pirates at Baseball Reference
1952 Pittsburgh Pirates at Baseball Almanac

Pittsburgh Pirates seasons
Pittsburgh Pirates season
Pittsburg Pir